State Highway 3 (West Bengal) is a state highway in West Bengal, India.

Route
SH 3 originates from Krishnanagar and passes through Hanskhali, Bagula,Helencha, Bangaon, Gaighata, Maslandapur, Baduria, Kholapota, Haroa, Rajarhat, Baguiati, Dhapa, Bhangar, Bamanpukuria, Minakhan, Nalmuri, Canning Town, Bhangonkhali, Sonakhali, Basanti and terminates at Godkhali near Gosaba.

The total length of SH 3 is 260 km.

Districts traversed by SH 3 are:
Nadia district (0 - 32 km)North 24 Parganas district (32 - 155 km)Kolkata district (155 - 164 km)South 24 Parganas district (164 - 260 km)

Road sections
It is divided into different sections as follows:

See also
List of state highways in West Bengal

References

External links
 
 

State Highways in West Bengal